The 1895 Penn State football team was an American football team that represented Pennsylvania State College—now known as Pennsylvania State University–as an independent during the 1895 college football season.  The team was coached by George Hoskins and played its home games on Beaver Field in University Park, Pennsylvania.

Schedule

References

Penn State
Penn State Nittany Lions football seasons
Penn State football